First-seeded Lew Hoad successfully defended his title, defeating Ashley Cooper in the final, 6–2, 6–1, 6–2 to win the gentlemen's singles tennis title at the 1957 Wimbledon Championships.

Seeds

  Lew Hoad (champion)
  Ashley Cooper (final)
  Ham Richardson (first round)
  Sven Davidson (semifinals)
  Neale Fraser (semifinals)
  Vic Seixas (quarterfinals)
  Herbie Flam (quarterfinals)
  Mervyn Rose (quarterfinals)

Draw

Finals

Top half

Section 1

Section 2

Section 3

Section 4

Bottom half

Section 5

Section 6

Section 7

Section 8

References

External links

Men's Singles
Wimbledon Championship by year – Men's singles